The Mallory Township Bridge was a historic structure located southwest of Osterdock, Iowa, United States. In the summer of 1890 Clayton County sought bids to provide small-scale iron and combination spans to cross several small streams. D.H. Young of Manchester, Iowa won the contract, and provided eight superstructures for $2,730. The wrought iron components were rolled at Lackawanna in Pittsburgh. The spans were delivered the same year and erected by county work crews. This bridge has subsequently been removed and replaced. It was listed on the National Register of Historic Places in 1998.

References

Bridges completed in 1890
Bridges in Clayton County, Iowa
National Register of Historic Places in Clayton County, Iowa
Road bridges on the National Register of Historic Places in Iowa
Truss bridges in Iowa
Former road bridges in the United States
Wrought iron bridges in the United States
Pratt truss bridges in the United States